Arturo Silva is an American-born novelist, editor, and teacher. His notable works include Tokio Whip (2016) and Philosophy of the Shirt (1986). He was also the editor of The Donald Richie Reader (2001).

Silva currently resides in Vienna, Austria where he teaches and writes.

References

Year of birth missing (living people)
Living people
American editors
American male novelists
American educators
Writers from Vienna
American emigrants to Austria